MTV Unplugged is a live performance by  Colombian band Aterciopelados, released in 1997. It was recorded before a live audience on April 3 of 1997 at the Miami Broadcast Center in Miami, Florida. Aterciopelados was the first Colombian band to record for MTV Unplugged.

Unofficial album
In 1997 Aterciopelados was promoting their new album La Pipa de la Paz. Due to the great reception of the album and successful album sales, MTV Latin America invited the band to hold an Unplugged session where they performed their greatest hits and a few songs from the latest album. Despite the concert being widely considered one of the best of its kind in history, there has not been an official release version of the album to date.

Track listing

Accolades

References

External links

1997 albums
Aterciopelados albums
MTV Unplugged albums
RCA Records live albums